Serbia participated at 2009 Mediterranean Games, for the first time after the separation of Serbia and Montenegro. As of 2018, Serbian athletes have won a total of 101 medals under their flag.

Results by games

Medals by sport

See also
 Serbia at the Olympics
 Serbia at the Paralympics
 Sport in Serbia

References

External links
Mediterranean Games, Olympic Committee of Serbia